Eriopyga is a genus of moths of the family Noctuidae. The genus was erected by Achille Guenée in 1852.

Species
The genus includes the following species:

 Eriopyga adjuntasa Schaus, 1940
 Eriopyga adonea (Druce, 1898)
 Eriopyga advena Draudt, 1924
 Eriopyga aenescans Dognin, 1916
 Eriopyga albipuncta (Schaus, 1894)
 Eriopyga albitorna Draudt, 1924
 Eriopyga albulirena Dognin, 1914
 Eriopyga approximans E. D. Jones, 1908
 Eriopyga atrisignata E. D. Jones, 1908
 Eriopyga augur Zerny, 1916
 Eriopyga azucara (Schaus, 1903)
 Eriopyga baruna (Schaus, 1898)
 Eriopyga bothorodes Dyar, 1914
 Eriopyga brachia de Joannis, 1904
 Eriopyga cacoena Dyar, 1918
 Eriopyga cillutincarae Zerny, 1916
 Eriopyga complexens Dyar, 1916
 Eriopyga condensa Dyar, 1910
 Eriopyga confluens Hampson, 1905
 Eriopyga contempta (Schaus, 1894)
 Eriopyga crista (Walker, 1856)
 Eriopyga croceifimbria Draudt, 1924
 Eriopyga crocosticta (Schaus, 1903)
 Eriopyga cupreola Draudt, 1924
 Eriopyga cymax Dyar, 1912
 Eriopyga descolei Köhler, 1947
 Eriopyga desiota Dyar, 1916
 Eriopyga diplopis Dyar, 1914
 Eriopyga ditissima (Walker, 1857)
 Eriopyga dyari Draudt, 1924
 Eriopyga dyschoroides (Schaus, 1898)
 Eriopyga eccarsia Dyar, 1914
 Eriopyga epipsilina Draudt, 1924
 Eriopyga erythropis Hampson, 1909
 Eriopyga euchroa Hampson, 1911
 Eriopyga eugrapha Hampson, 1913
 Eriopyga evanida Schaus, 1911
 Eriopyga excavata Hampson, 1905
 Eriopyga fea (Druce, 1889)
 Eriopyga flammans Dognin, 1907
 Eriopyga flavirufa Hampson, 1909
 Eriopyga friburgensis (Guenée, 1852)
 Eriopyga fulvida Druce, 1905
 Eriopyga fuscescens Draudt, 1924
 Eriopyga glacistis Hampson, 1905
 Eriopyga glaucopis Hampson, 1909
 Eriopyga griseirena Schaus, 1906
 Eriopyga griseorufa Druce, 1908
 Eriopyga ignita E. D. Jones, 1915
 Eriopyga infelix Dyar, 1910
 Eriopyga iridescens Draudt, 1924
 Eriopyga janeira (Schaus, 1898)
 Eriopyga lactipex Dognin, 1914
 Eriopyga lathen Dyar, 1927
 Eriopyga leucocraspis Dognin, 1916
 Eriopyga lilacea Köhler, 1947
 Eriopyga limonis Schaus, 1911
 Eriopyga lindigi (Felder & Rogenhofer, 1874)
 Eriopyga lubrica Dognin, 1914
 Eriopyga lycophotia E. D. Jones, 1915
 Eriopyga macrolepia Hampson, 1905
 Eriopyga magnifica Zerny, 1916
 Eriopyga magniorbis Dognin, 1914
 Eriopyga magnirena Dognin, 1914
 Eriopyga marginalis (Schaus, 1903)
 Eriopyga mediorufa (Schaus, 1903)
 Eriopyga melaleuca Druce, 1908
 Eriopyga melanogaster (Guenée, 1852)
 Eriopyga melanosigma Hampson, 1909
 Eriopyga melanosticta Hampson, 1905
 Eriopyga mesostrigata Hampson, 1905
 Eriopyga metanensis Köhler, 1947
 Eriopyga milio Dyar, 1916
 Eriopyga moesta (Walker, 1858)
 Eriopyga moneti Schaus, 1911
 Eriopyga monilis (Guenée, 1852)
 Eriopyga monochroa Hampson, 1913
 Eriopyga monopis Dyar, 1914
 Eriopyga motilona Schaus, 1933
 Eriopyga mucorea Draudt, 1924
 Eriopyga nanduna Schaus, 1933
 Eriopyga nigridorsia E. D. Jones, 1908
 Eriopyga nigrocollaris Köhler, 1947
 Eriopyga nisio Dyar, 1916
 Eriopyga niveipuncta (Schaus, 1894)
 Eriopyga ochrota (Schaus, 1903)
 Eriopyga oroba (Druce, 1889)
 Eriopyga panostigma Dyar, 1910
 Eriopyga pansapha Dyar, 1918
 Eriopyga pariole Draudt, 1924
 Eriopyga paulista E. D. Jones, 1915
 Eriopyga perfusata Dognin, 1914
 Eriopyga perfusca Hampson, 1905
 Eriopyga perrubra Hampson, 1909
 Eriopyga phaeostigma Druce, 1908
 Eriopyga phanerozona Dyar, 1918
 Eriopyga poasina Schaus, 1911
 Eriopyga poliotis Hampson, 1905
 Eriopyga polygrapha Hampson, 1913
 Eriopyga prasinospila Hampson, 1911
 Eriopyga punctulum Guenée, 1852
 Eriopyga pyropis Hampson, 1905
 Eriopyga ratelusia Dyar, 1916
 Eriopyga rea Dyar, 1916
 Eriopyga remipes Zerny, 1916
 Eriopyga renalba Schaus, 1911
 Eriopyga rhadata (Druce, 1894)
 Eriopyga rhimla Dyar, 1910
 Eriopyga rhodohoria Dyar, 1916
 Eriopyga ropilla (Dognin, 1897)
 Eriopyga rubicundula Schaus, 1911
 Eriopyga rubifer Dyar, 1916
 Eriopyga rubor (Guenée, 1852)
 Eriopyga rubripuncta (Schaus, 1903)
 Eriopyga rubrirena Hampson, 1913
 Eriopyga scalaris Draudt, 1924
 Eriopyga simplex Dyar, 1916
 Eriopyga spodiaca Dognin, 1914
 Eriopyga stenia Dognin, 1907
 Eriopyga stictipenna Dyar, 1914
 Eriopyga strigifacta Dyar, 1910
 Eriopyga stygia Dognin, 1908
 Eriopyga sublecta Dyar, 1910
 Eriopyga subolivacea Hampson, 1905
 Eriopyga subtegula Dognin, 1914
 Eriopyga suffusa E. D. Jones, 1915
 Eriopyga sutrix Draudt, 1924
 Eriopyga taciturna Dognin, 1914
 Eriopyga tama Schaus, 1933
 Eriopyga tebota Dyar, 1916
 Eriopyga tenebrosa Draudt, 1924
 Eriopyga tersa (Druce, 1898)
 Eriopyga tertulia (Dognin, 1897)
 Eriopyga thermistis Druce, 1905
 Eriopyga thermosema Dognin, 1919
 Eriopyga torrida Dognin, 1907
 Eriopyga trinotata Draudt, 1924
 Eriopyga umbracula Dognin, 1914
 Eriopyga unicolora (Maassen, 1890)
 Eriopyga viuda (Dognin, 1897)
 Eriopyga volcania Schaus, 1911
 Eriopyga xera Dyar, 1914

Former species
 Eriopyga iole is now Pseudorthodes iole (Schaus, 1894)

References
 
 

Hadeninae